Polyscias quintasii is a species of plant in the family Araliaceae. It is endemic to São Tomé and Príncipe. It was first described by Arthur Wallis Exell in 1944.

References

Endemic flora of São Tomé and Príncipe
quintasii
Endangered plants
Plants described in 1944
Taxonomy articles created by Polbot